Mr. Denning Drives North is a 1951 British mystery film directed by Anthony Kimmins and starring John Mills, Phyllis Calvert and Sam Wanamaker. The plot concerns an aircraft manufacturer (Mills) who accidentally kills the boyfriend (Herbert Lom) of his daughter (Moore) and tries to dispose of the body. Alec Coppel wrote the script, adapted from his own 1950 novel of the same title. It was made at Shepperton Studios.

Plot
Aircraft manufacturer Tom Denning (John Mills) is married to Kay (Phyllis Calvert); they have a daughter, Liz (Eileen Moore). Liz is dating Mados (Herbert Lom) who Tom "accidentally" kills by punching him. Instead of calling the police, Tom disposes of the body in a ditch. He tries to disguise the victim by placing a large overly-ornate ring on the victim's finger. Later, torn with his guilt, he goes back to pick up the body only to find that it has disappeared.

Cast
 John Mills as Tom Denning
 Phyllis Calvert as Kay Denning
 Eileen Moore as Liz Denning
 Sam Wanamaker as Chick Eddowes
 Herbert Lom as Mados
 Raymond Huntley as Wright
 Russell Waters as Harry Stoper
 Wilfrid Hyde-White as Woods
 Freda Jackson as Ma Smith
 Trader Faulkner as Ted Smith
 Sheila Shand Gibbs as Matilda
 Bernard Lee as Inspector Dodds
 Michael Shepley as Chairman of Court
 Ronald Adam as Coroner
 John Stuart as Wilson
 Hugh Morton as Inspector Snell
 David Davies as Chauffeur
 Ambrosine Phillpotts as Miss Blade

Original novel

The film was based on a novel by Coppel that was published in late 1950.

The Washington Post thought the Rolls-Royce "made more sense than any of the alleged human characters... a bit pretentious."

Production
Film rights were bought by Alexander Korda's London Films. John Mills' casting was announced in May 1951. It was Mills' first film in almost two years.

At one stage Dane Clark and Pat Roc were reportedly going to support Mills.

Sam Wanamaker had been living in England since 1949 and was offered the part after writing to his agent from holiday in France asking if any jobs were going.

Reception

Box office
The film performed poorly at the British box office.

Critical reception
The New York Times wrote, "this little melodrama serves as still another reminder, from a country that jolly well knows how to exercise it, that restraint can work minor wonders...Persuasive and tingling, minus one false note... No doubt about it. The British have what it takes."

References

External links

Review at Variety

British mystery films
Films directed by Anthony Kimmins
Films scored by Benjamin Frankel
Films set in England
Films set in London
1950s mystery films
British black-and-white films
1950s English-language films
1950s British films